Marquette River is a tributary of Ashuapmushuan Lake, flowing into the unorganized territory of Lac-Ashuapmushuan, Quebec, into the Regional County Municipality (RCM) of Le Domaine-du-Roy, in the administrative region
from Saguenay-Lac-Saint-Jean, in Quebec, in Canada.

The Marquette River runs successively in the townships of Châteauford, Cramahé and Aigremont. The central part of the river flows through the Ashuapmushuan Wildlife Reserve. Forestry is the main economic activity of this valley; recreational tourism activities, second.

The Forest Road R0212 (East-West) intersects the upper portion of the Marquette River. The route 167 connecting Chibougamau to Saint-Félicien, Québec passes on the north-east shore of the Normandin River and the Northeast side of Ashuapmushuan Lake.

The surface of the Marquette River is usually frozen from early November to mid-May, however, safe ice movement is generally from mid-November to mid-April.

Geography

Toponymy 
This hydronym evokes the work of life of Jacques Marquette (Laon, France, 1637 - near Luddington, Michigan, 1675). He was a Jesuit missionary and explorer. He first studied Amerindian languages, then he devoted himself to various missions including the Outaouais; in 1671, he founded the mission of Saint-Ignace, among the Wendat (Hurons), on the north shore of the Michilimakinac Strait. In 1672, he met Louis Jolliet with whom he would reach the Mississippi River. He will explore this river to the present border of Arkansas and Louisiana. Anxious to found a mission with the Kaskaskias in the Illinois country, Father Marquette must give it up because of illness.

The toponym "Rivière Marquette" was formalized on December 5, 1968, at the Commission de toponymie du Québec.

Notes and references

See also 

Rivers of Saguenay–Lac-Saint-Jean
Le Domaine-du-Roy Regional County Municipality